A  is a neighbourhood in several Italian cities. A  is a territorial subdivision. The word derives from the Latin , the 14 subdivisions of Rome imposed by Augustus.

See also
 Circoscrizione
 Frazione
 Località
 Quartiere
 Rioni of Rome
 Sestiere
 Terziere

References

Subdivisions of Italy